The qualifying rounds for the 1999–2000 UEFA Champions League began on 13 July 1999. In total, there were three qualifying rounds which provided 16 clubs to join the group stage.

Teams

First qualifying round
The draw for this round was performed on 30 June 1999 in Geneva, Switzerland.

Seeding

Summary

|}

Matches

ÍBV won 3–1 on aggregate.

Litex Lovech won 5–0 on aggregate.

Žalgiris Vilnius won 5–0 on aggregate.

Haka won 7–1 on aggregate.

Partizan won 10–1 on aggregate.

Skonto won 10–0 on aggregate.

2–2 on aggregate; Sloga Jugomagnat won on away goals.

Valletta won 3–2 on aggregate.

Zimbru Chișinău won 10–0 on aggregate.

Second qualifying round
The draw for this round was performed on 30 June 1999 in Geneva, Switzerland. Unlike the future seasons of Champions League qualification, all winners of previous round were treated as unseeded regardless of their coefficients.

Seeding

Notes

Summary

|}

Matches

Rapid Wien won 5–0 on aggregate.

Anorthosis won 3–2 on aggregate.

Partizan won 6–1 on aggregate.

Molde won 4–2 on aggregate.

5–5 on aggregate; Widzew Łódź won on penalties.

Rangers won 7–1 on aggregate.

Zimbru Chișinău won 3–2 on aggregate.

AIK won 3–0 on aggregate.

Brøndby won 2–0 on aggregate.

Skonto won 5–4 on aggregate.

1–1 on aggregate; Hapoel Haifa won on away goals.

Dynamo Kyiv won 3–0 on aggregate.

MTK Hungária won 5–1 on aggregate.

Maribor won 5–4 on aggregate.

Third qualifying round
The draw for this round was performed on 23 July 1999 in Geneva, Switzerland. Unlike the future seasons of Champions League qualification, all winners of previous round were treated as unseeded regardless of their coefficients.

Seeding

Notes

Summary
Losing teams advanced to the first round of the 1999–2000 UEFA Cup.

|}

Matches

PSV Eindhoven won 2–0 on aggregate.

Spartak Moscow won 5–1 on aggregate.

Chelsea won 3–0 on aggregate.

Galatasaray won 4–0 on aggregate.

Fiorentina won 5–1 on aggregate.

Dynamo Kyiv won 4–3 on aggregate.

Rangers won 2–1 on aggregate.

Boavista won 6–3 on aggregate.

AIK won 1–0 on aggregate.

Valencia won 4–0 on aggregate.

Hertha BSC won 2–0 on aggregate.

Sturm Graz won 4–3 on aggregate.

1–1 on aggregate; Molde won on away goals.

Maribor won 3–0 on aggregate.

Croatia Zagreb won 2–0 on aggregate.

Borussia Dortmund won 2–0 on aggregate.

References

External links
 1999–2000 season at UEFA website

Qualifying Rounds
1999-2000